Kutsevol Anatolii is a Ukrainian politician, diplomat, Deputy State Secretary of the Government of Ukraine from October 2020

Biography

Anatolii Kutsevol was born in Kyiv. Graduated from Taras Shevchenko National University of Kyiv with a Master of Philology diploma (2007), obtained a diploma in Economics (2009) and a Master of Public Administration (2013) in the National Academy for Public Administration of the President of Ukraine.
 
Holds a Ph.D. in Public Administration (2021).

Career 
Anatolii Kutsevol started his career as a public servant in 2007 at the Department for International Technical Assistance and Cooperation with the International Financial Institutions at the Ministry of Economy of Ukraine. where he has been responsible for the US and Canadian development assistance projects as well as for Ukraine cooperation with the OECD.

Mr. Kutsevol is a supporter of the European integration of Ukraine and for this reason in 2008-2011 he served in the Bureau of European Integration at the Secretariat of the Cabinet of Ministers of Ukraine. There he was responsible for cooperation with the EU on the economic issues and statistics, justice, freedom, and security reforms, technical assistance, the negotiation process with the European Commission on development, implementation of the Ukraine-EU Agenda and association agreement, general political issues of cooperation between Ukraine and the EU. While working at the Bureau in 2010 he participated in the Program of Retraining of Young Ukrainian Managers in the Offices of the Federal Chancellor and the Federal President of Germany.

In 2011 Anatolii Kutsevol worked in the Office of the President of Ukraine. where his area of responsibility was focused on the foreign economic policy of Ukraine, customs legislation reform and Deep and Comprehensive Free Trade Area between Ukraine and the EU, Ukraine's cooperation with international financial organizations, in particular, the World Bank Group, EBRD, EIB, and development partners on technical assistance.

Right after the Revolution of Dignity in Ukraine Mr. Kutsevol became the Deputy Director of the Government Office for Coordination of the European Integration (2014-2016) where he was responsible for forming Ukraine's European integration policy, upholding the political dialogue with the EU, coordinating the EU-Ukraine association bodies.

Since the European integration of Ukraine became the main driver for comprehensive reforms and changes in Ukraine in 2016-219 Mr. Kutsevol actively promoted environmental agenda while working as the Director of the Reform Support Team at the Ministry of Environment of Ukraine. He was personally involved in drafting of the EU approximized new legislation on waste management, environmental monitoring, control and liability, an integrated permit for large enterprises, which are the largest polluters.
  
In 2020 Anatolii Kutsevol served as a Strategic Adviser to the Deputy Prime Minister on European and Euro-Atlantic Integration of Ukraine and to the Prime Minister of Ukraine advising on the EU and SDG agenda.

On October 12, 2020, the Government of Ukraine appointed Mr. Kutsevol the Deputy State Secretary of the Cabinet of Ministers of Ukraine dealing with EU, NATO, international relations, technical and financial assistance, sanctions.

Language spoken 
Ukrainian, English, Italian.

Other information 
Civil servant of the 2rd rank. Holds the diplomatic rank of Counselor of the First class.

Awarded the Certificates of the Prime Minister of Ukraine (2021), the Head of the State Border Guard Service of Ukraine (2021), the Head of the State Customs Service of Ukraine (2022), International Trade Council Go Global Awards 2022 for Leadership in Economic Doplomacy.

References 

Ukrainian politicians
Ukrainian diplomats
Cabinet Office ministers of Ukraine
Living people
1985 births